Courcelle-sur-Yvette is a RER B station of Gif-sur-Yvette, near Paris, in France. It's also the name of a district of this town.
An underpass was built in 1983 to connect the two sides of the way.

Connections
 Noctilien: N122
 SAVAC (bus) : 39.02, Mobicaps n°12

Réseau Express Régional stations
Railway stations in Essonne
Railway stations in France opened in 1867